Lodderia mandulana is a minute, fossil sea snail or micromollusc, a marine gastropod mollusc in the family Skeneidae.

Description
The height of the shell attains 1.6 mm, its diameter 3 mm.

Distribution
This fossil marine species is found in the Mandul Marl Formation of the Mandul Island, northeast of Kalimantan Island.

References

mandulana